Pedro Orlando Grifol (born November 28, 1969) is an American former professional baseball player and coach. He is the current manager for the Chicago White Sox of Major League Baseball (MLB). He previously served as a coach for the Kansas City Royals of MLB.

Playing career
Grifol attended Christopher Columbus High School in Miami, Florida, where he was the Florida high school baseball player of the year in 1988. He attended Florida State University, where he played college baseball for the Florida State Seminoles baseball team. With the Seminoles, Grifol participated in the 1989 and 1991 College World Series. He was named an All-American in 1991. In 1990 and 1991, he played collegiate summer baseball with the Brewster Whitecaps of the Cape Cod Baseball League and was named a league all-star in 1990.

The Minnesota Twins selected Grifol in the sixth round of the 1991 Major League Baseball draft. He played in the minor leagues for the Twins and New York Mets organizations from 1991 to 1999. He worked for the Seattle Mariners as their director of minor league operations.

Coaching career
Grifol joined the Kansas City Royals organization in 2013 as a minor league coach. He was promoted to the major league staff in May 2013 as an assistant hitting coach. He was moved to be a catching instructor in 2014. In 2015, the Kansas City Royals won the World Series, their first World Series in 30 years. For the 2020 season, Grifol was named as the Royals bench coach.

On November 1, 2022, Grifol was hired by the Chicago White Sox to be their 42nd manager.

Personal life
Grifol and his wife, Ali, have three daughters.

References

External links

1969 births
Living people
Major League Baseball bench coaches
Chicago White Sox managers
Kansas City Royals coaches
Florida State Seminoles baseball players
Brewster Whitecaps players
Elizabethton Twins players
Orlando Sun Rays players
Fort Myers Miracle players
Nashville Xpress players
Portland Beavers players
Hardware City Rock Cats players
Binghamton Mets players
Norfolk Tides players
Seattle Mariners executives
Seattle Mariners scouts
Baseball coaches from Florida
Baseball players from Miami
Sports coaches from Miami
All-American college baseball players
Christopher Columbus High School (Miami-Dade County, Florida) alumni
Minor league baseball managers
American expatriate baseball people in Venezuela